Zinc finger protein 436 is a protein that in humans is encoded by the ZNF436 gene.

See also
ZNF692

References

Further reading